Samuel Mansfield   (1815 – 12 December 1893) was a member of the Bombay Civil Service from 1834 to 1872.

Mansfield was the brother of General William Mansfield, 1st Baron Sandhurst, who was Commander-in-Chief of India from 1865 to 1870. He was educated at Haileybury.

He was the Commissioner in Sind from 1862 to March 1867. During his tenure, a separate Judicial Commissioner was appointed for Sind, thus relieving him of this role. He was a member of the senior council of Bombay from 1867 to 1872.

Mansfield was appointed a Companion of the Order of the Star of India in the 1866 Birthday Honours.

References

1815 births
1893 deaths
Indian Civil Service (British India) officers
Companions of the Order of the Star of India
British East India Company civil servants
People educated at Haileybury and Imperial Service College